The McDonnell Douglas DC-9 is an American five-abreast, single-aisle aircraft designed by the Douglas Aircraft Company. It was initially produced by the developer company as the Douglas DC-9 until August 1967 and then by McDonnell Douglas.

After introducing its heavy DC-8 in 1959, Douglas approved the smaller, all-new DC-9 for shorter flights on April 8, 1963.
The DC-9-10 first flew on February 25, 1965, and gained its type certificate on November 23, to enter service with Delta Air Lines on December 8.

The aircraft has two rear-mounted Pratt & Whitney JT8D low-bypass turbofans under a T-tail for a cleaner wing aerodynamic, a two-person flight deck, and built-in airstairs.

The Series 10 aircraft are 104 ft (32 m) long for typically 90 coach seats. The Series 30, stretched by 15 ft (4.5 m) to seat 115 in economy, has a larger wing and more powerful engines for a higher maximum takeoff weight (MTOW); it first flew in August 1966 and entered service in February 1967.
The Series 20 has the Series 10 fuselage, more powerful engines, and the Series 30's improved wings; it first flew in September 1968 and entered service in January 1969.
The Series 40 was further lengthened by 6 ft (2 m) for 125 passengers, and the final DC-9-50 series first flew in 1974, stretched again by 8 ft (2.5 m) for 135 passengers.
When deliveries ended in October 1982, 976 had been built.
Smaller variants competed with the BAC One-Eleven, Fokker F28, and Sud Aviation Caravelle, and larger ones with the original Boeing 737.

The original DC-9 was followed by the second generation in 1980, the MD-80 series, a lengthened DC-9-50 with a larger wing and a higher MTOW. 
This was further developed into the third generation, the MD-90, in the early 1990s, as the body was stretched again, fitted with V2500 high-bypass turbofans, and an updated flight deck.
The shorter and final version, the MD-95, was renamed the Boeing 717 after McDonnell Douglas's merger with Boeing in 1997; it is powered by Rolls-Royce BR715 engines.
The DC-9 family was produced between 1965 and 2006 with a total delivery of 2441 units: 976 DC-9s, 1191 MD-80s, 116 MD-90s, and 155 Boeing 717s.
As of August 2022, 250 aircraft remain in service: 31 DC-9s (freighter), 116 MD-80s (mainly freighter), and 103 Boeing 717s (passenger), while the MD-90 was retired without freighter conversion.

Development

Origins
During the 1950s, Douglas Aircraft studied a short- to medium-range airliner to complement their high-capacity, long-range DC-8. (DC stands for Douglas Commercial.) A medium-range, four-engined Model 2067 was studied, but it did not receive enough interest from airlines and it was abandoned. In 1960, Douglas signed a two-year contract with Sud Aviation for technical cooperation. Douglas would market and support the Sud Aviation Caravelle and produce a licensed version if airlines ordered large numbers. None were ordered and Douglas returned to its design studies after the co-operation deal expired.

In 1962, design studies were underway. The first version seated 63 passengers and had a gross weight of 69,000 lb (31,300 kg). This design was changed into what would be the initial DC-9 variant. Douglas gave approval to produce the DC-9 on April 8, 1963. Unlike the competing but larger Boeing 727 trijet, which used as many 707 components as possible, the DC-9 was an all-new design.

Entry into service

The first DC-9, a production model, flew on February 25, 1965. The second DC-9 flew a few weeks later, with a test fleet of five aircraft flying by July. This allowed the initial Series 10 to gain airworthiness certification on November 23, 1965, and to enter service with Delta Air Lines on December 8. The DC-9 was always intended to be available in multiple versions to suit customer requirements; the first stretched version, the Series 30, with a longer fuselage and extended wing tips, flew on August 1, 1966, entering service with Eastern Air Lines in 1967. The initial Series 10 was followed by the improved -20, -30, and -40 variants. The final DC-9 series was the -50, which first flew in 1974.

Production
The DC-9 series, the first generation of the DC-9 family, was a commercial success for the manufacturer. It was produced on the final assembly line in Long Beach, California, beginning in 1965, and later was on a common line with the second generation of the DC-9 family, the MD-80, with which it shares its line number sequence. After the delivery of 976 DC-9s and 108 MD-80s, McDonnell Douglas stopped DC-9 series production in December 1982,

The DC-9 family is one of the longest-lasting aircraft in production and operation. Its last family member, the Boeing 717, was produced until 2006. The DC-9 family was produced in total  units: 976 DC-9s (first generation), 1191 MD-80s (second generation), 116 MD-90s, and 155 Boeing 717s (third generation). This compared to 2,970 Airbus A320s and 5,270 Boeing 737s delivered as of 2006.

Enhancement studies
Studies aimed at further improving DC-9 fuel efficiency, by means of retrofitted wingtips of various types, were undertaken by McDonnell Douglas, but these did not demonstrate significant benefits, especially with existing fleets shrinking. The wing design makes retrofitting difficult. Between 1973 and 1975, McDonnell Douglas studied the possibility of  replacing engines on the DC-9 with the JT8D-109 turbofan, a quieter and more efficient variant of the JT8D. This progressed to the flight-test stage, and tests achieved noise reduction between 8 and 9 decibels depending on the phase of flight. No further aircraft were modified, and the test aircraft was re-equipped with standard JT8D-9s prior to delivery to its airline customer.

Further developments (DC-9 family)
Two further developments of the original or first generation DC-9 series used the new designation with McDonnell Douglas initials (MD- prefix) followed by the year of development. The first derivative or second generation was the MD-80 series and the second derivative or third generation was the MD-90 series. Together, they formed the DC-9 family of 12 aircraft members (variants), and if the DC-9- designation were retained, the family members would be: First generation (Series 10, Series 20, Series 30, Series 40, and Series 50), second generation (Series 81, Series 82, Series 83, Series 87, and Series 88), and third generation (Series 90 and Series 95).

Second generation (MD-80 series)

The original DC-9 series was followed in 1980 by the introduction of the second generation of the DC-9 family, the MD-80 series. This was originally called the DC-9-80 (short Series 80 and later stylized Super 80). It was a lengthened DC-9-50 with a higher maximum takeoff weight (MTOW), a larger wing, new main landing gear, and higher fuel capacity. The MD-80 series features a number of variants of the Pratt & Whitney JT8D turbofan engine having higher thrust ratings than those available on the original DC-9 series. The MD-80 series includes the MD-81, MD-82, MD-83, MD-88, and shortest variant, the MD-87.

Third generation (MD-90 series)

MD-90
The MD-80 series was further developed into the third generation, the MD-90 series, in the early 1990s. It has yet another fuselage stretch, an electronic flight instrument system (first introduced on the MD-88), and completely new International Aero V2500 high-bypass turbofan engines. In comparison to the very successful MD-80, relatively few MD-90s were built.

 Boeing 717 (MD-95)
The shorter and final variant, the MD-95, was renamed the Boeing 717 after McDonnell Douglas's merger with Boeing in 1997 and before aircraft deliveries began. The fuselage length and wing are very similar to those of the DC-9-30, but much use was made of lighter, modern materials. Power is supplied by two BMW/Rolls-Royce BR715 high-bypass turbofan engines.

 Comac ARJ21
China's Comac ARJ21 is derived from the DC-9 family. The ARJ21 is built with manufacturing tooling from the MD-90 Trunkliner program. As a consequence, it has the same fuselage cross-section, nose profile, and tail.

Design

The DC-9 has two rear-mounted Pratt & Whitney JT8D turbofan engines, relatively small, efficient wings, and a T-tail. The DC-9's takeoff weight was limited to 80,000 lb (36,300 kg) for a two-person flight crew by the then-Federal Aviation Agency regulations at the time. DC-9 aircraft have five seats across for economy seating. The airplane seats 80 to 135 passengers, depending on version and seating arrangement.

The DC-9 was designed for short to medium routes, often to smaller airports with shorter runways and less ground infrastructure than the major airports being served by larger designs like the Boeing 707 and Douglas DC-8. Accessibility and short-field characteristics were needed.  Turnarounds were simplified by built-in airstairs, including one in the tail, which shortened boarding and deplaning times.

The tail-mounted engine design facilitated a clean wing without engine pods, which had numerous advantages. For example, flaps could be longer, unimpeded by pods on the leading edge and engine-blast concerns on the trailing edge. This simplified design improved airflow at low speeds and enabled lower takeoff and approach speeds, thus lowering field length requirements and keeping wing structure light.  The second advantage of the tail-mounted engines was the reduction in foreign object damage from ingested debris from runways and aprons, but with this position, the engines could ingest ice streaming off the wing roots.  Third, the absence of engines in underslung pods allowed a reduction in fuselage ground clearance, making the aircraft more accessible to baggage handlers and passengers.

The problem of deep stalling, revealed by the loss of the BAC One-Eleven prototype in 1963, was overcome through various changes, including the introduction of vortilons, small surfaces beneath the wings' leading edges used to control airflow and increase low-speed lift.

Variants
The DC-9 series, the first generation of the DC-9 family, includes five members or variants and 10 subvariants, which are the production versions (types). Their designations use the Series (DC-9-) prefix followed by a two-digit numbering with the same first digit and the second digit being a zero for variant names and a nonzero for version/type designations. The first variant, Series 10 (DC-9-10), has four versions (Series 11, Series 12, Series 14 and Series 15); the second variant, Series 20, has one version (Series 21); the third variant, Series 30, has four versions (Series 31, Series 32, Series 33 and Series 34); the fourth variant, Series 40, has one version (Series 41); and the fifth or final variant, Series 50, has one version (Series 51).

Series 10

Subvariant Series 11, Series 12, Series 14, Series 15 
The original DC-9 (later designated the Series 10) was the smallest DC-9 variant. The Series 10 was similar in size and configuration to the BAC One-Eleven and featured a T-tail and rear-mounted engines. Power was provided by a pair of  Pratt & Whitney JT8D-5 or  JT8D-7 engines. A total of 137 were built. Delta Air Lines was the initial operator.

The Series 10 was produced in two main subvariants, the Series 14 and 15, although, of the first four aircraft, three were built as Series 11s and one as Series 12. These were later converted to Series 14 standard. No Series 13 was produced. A passenger/cargo version of the aircraft, with a  side cargo door forward of the wing and a reinforced cabin floor, was certificated on March 1, 1967. Cargo versions included the Series 15MC (minimum change) with folding seats that can be carried in the rear of the aircraft, and the Series 15RC (rapid change) with seats removable on pallets. These differences disappeared over the years as new interiors were installed.

The Series 10 was unique in the DC-9 family in not having leading-edge slats. The Series 10 was designed to have short takeoff and landing distances without the use of leading-edge high-lift devices. Therefore, the wing design of the Series 10 featured airfoils with extremely high maximum-lift capability to obtain the low stalling speeds necessary for short-field performance.

Series 10 features

The Series 10 was offered with the -thrust JT8D-1 and JT8D-7. All versions of the DC-9 are equipped with an AlliedSignal (Garrett) GTCP85 APU, located in the aft fuselage. The Series 10, as with all later versions of the DC-9, is equipped with a two-crew analog flightdeck.

The Series 14 has a fuel capacity of 3,693 US gallons (with the 907 US gal centre section fuel).

The aircraft is fitted with a passenger door in the port forward fuselage, and a service door/emergency exit is installed opposite. An airstair installed below the front passenger door was available as an option as was an airstair in the tailcone. This also doubled as an emergency exit. Available with either two or four overwing exits, the DC-9-10 can seat up to a maximum certified exit limit of 109 passengers. Typical all-economy layout is 90 passengers, and 72 passengers in a more typical mixed-class layout with 12 first and 60 economy-class passengers.

All versions of the DC-9 are equipped with a tricycle undercarriage, featuring a twin nose unit and twin main units.

Series 20

Subvariant Series 21
The Series 20 was designed to satisfy a Scandinavian Airlines request for improved short-field performance by using the more-powerful engines and improved wings of the -30 combined with the shorter fuselage used in the -10. Ten Series 20 aircraft were produced, all as the Model -21. The -21 had slats and stairs at the rear of plane.

In 1969, a DC-9 Series 20 at Long Beach was fitted with an Elliott Flight Automation Head-up display by McDonnell Douglas and used for successful three-month-long trials with pilots from various airlines, the Federal Aviation Administration, and the US Air Force.

Series 20 features
The DC-9 Series 20 is powered by the  thrust JT8D-11 engine.

The Series 20, using the same wing as the Series 30, 40 and 50, has a slightly lower basic fuel capacity than the Series 10 (3,679 US gallons).

Series 20 milestones
 First flight: September 18, 1968.
 FAA certification: November 25, 1968.
 First delivery: December 11, 1968, to Scandinavian Airlines System (SAS)
 Entry into service: January 27, 1969, with SAS.
 Last delivery: May 1, 1969, to SAS.

Series 30

Subvariant Series 31, Series 32, Series 33, Series 34 
The Series 30 was produced to counter Boeing's 737 twinjet; 662 were built, about 60% of the total. Maximum takeoff weight was typically .

Unlike the Series 10, the Series 30 had leading-edge devices to reduce the landing speeds at higher landing weights; full-span slats reduced approach speeds by six knots despite 5,000 lb greater weight. The slats were lighter than slotted Krueger flaps, since the structure associated with the slat is a more efficient torque box than the structure associated with the slotted Krueger. The wing had a six-percent increase in chord, all ahead of the front spar, allowing the 15 percent chord slat to be incorporated.

Series 30 versions
The Series 30 was built in four main sub-variants.

 DC-9-31: Produced in passenger version only. The first DC-9 Series 30 flew on August 1, 1966, and the first delivery was to Eastern Airlines on February 27, 1967, after certification on December 19, 1966.
 DC-9-32: Introduced in the first year (1967). Certificated March 1, 1967. A number of cargo versions of the Series 32 were also produced:
 32LWF (Light Weight Freight) with modified cabin but no cargo door or reinforced floor, intended for package freighter use.
 32CF (Convertible Freighter), with a reinforced floor but retaining passenger facilities
 32AF (All Freight), a windowless all-cargo aircraft.
 DC-9-33: Following the Series 31 and 32 came the Series 33 for passenger/cargo or all-cargo use. JT8D-9 or -11 ( thrust) engines were used. Wing incidence was increased 1.25 degrees to reduce cruise drag. Only 22 were built, as All Freight (AF), Convertible Freight (CF) and Rapid Change (RC) aircraft.
The DC-9-34CF (Convertible Freighter) was certificated April 20, 1976, while the passenger followed on November 3, 1976. The aircraft has the more powerful JT8D-9s with the -15 and -17 engines as an option. It had the wing incidence change introduced on the DC-9-33. Twelve were built, five as convertible freighters.

Series 30 features
The DC-9-30 was offered with a selection of variants of JT8D including the -1, -7, -9, -11, -15. and -17. The most common on the Series 31 is the JT8D-7 ( thrust), although it was also available with the −9 and -17 engines. On the Series 32 the JT8D-9 ( thrust) was standard, with the -11 also offered. The Series 33 was offered with the JT8D-9 or -11 ( thrust) engines and the heavyweight -34 with the JT8D-9, -15 ( thrust) or -17 ( thrust) engines.

Series 40

Subvariant Series 41
The DC-9-40 is a further lengthened version. With a  longer fuselage, accommodation was up to 125 passengers. A total of 71 were produced. The variant first entered service with Scandinavian Airlines System (SAS) in March 1968.

Series 50

Subvariant Series 51
The Series 50 was the largest version of the DC-9 to enter airline service. It features an  fuselage stretch and seats up to 139 passengers. It entered revenue service in August 1975 with Eastern Airlines and included a number of detail improvements, a new cabin interior, and more powerful JT8D-15 or -17 engines in the  class. McDonnell Douglas delivered 96, all as the Model -51. Some visual cues to distinguish this version from other DC-9 variants include side strakes or fins below the side cockpit windows, spray deflectors on the nose gear, and thrust reversers angled inward 17 degrees as compared to the original configuration. The thrust reverser modification was developed by Air Canada for its earlier aircraft, and adopted by McDonnell Douglas as a standard feature on the series 50. It was also applied to many earlier DC-9s in the course of regular maintenance.

Military and government

Operators

A total of 22 DC-9 series are in service as of February 2023. Operators include Aeronaves TSM (11), Ameristar Charters (4), and other operators with fewer aircraft.

After acquiring Northwest Airlines, Delta Air Lines operated a fleet of DC-9 aircraft, most of which were over 30 years old at the time. With severe increases in fuel prices in the summer of 2008, Northwest Airlines began retiring its DC-9s, switching to Airbus A319s that are 27% more fuel efficient.  As the Northwest/Delta merger progressed, Delta returned several stored DC-9s to service.  Delta Air Lines made its last DC-9 commercial flight from Minneapolis/St. Paul to Atlanta on January 6, 2014, with the flight number DL2014.

With the existing DC-9 fleet shrinking, modifications do not appear to be likely to occur, especially since the wing design makes retrofitting difficult.  DC-9s are therefore likely to be further replaced in service by newer airliners such as Boeing 737, Airbus A320, Embraer E-Jets, and the Bombardier CSeries.

One ex-SAS DC-9-21 is operated as a skydiving jump platform at Perris Valley Airport in Perris, California. With the steps on the ventral stairs removed, it is the only airline transport class jet certified to date by the FAA for skydiving operations as of 2016.

Deliveries
Accidents and incidents
, the DC-9 family aircraft has been involved in 276 major aviation accidents and incidents, including 156 hull-losses, with 3,697 fatalities combined (all generations of family members) = (1st gen., DC-9 series): 107 hull-losses & 2,250 fatalities + (2nd gen., MD-80 series): 46 hull-losses & 1,446 fatalities + (3rd gen., MD-90 series including Boeing 717): 3 hull-losses & 1 fatality.fatality statistics Douglas DC-9. Aviation Safety Network. Retrieved 19 July 2022.

Accidents with fatalities
 On October 1, 1966, West Coast Airlines Flight 956 crashed with eighteen fatalities and no survivors. This accident marked the first loss of a DC-9.
 On March 9, 1967, TWA Flight 553 crashed in a field in Concord Township, near Urbana, Ohio, following a mid-air collision with a Beechcraft Baron, an accident that triggered substantial changes in air traffic control procedures. All 25 people on board the DC-9 were killed.
 On March 27, 1968, Ozark Air Lines Flight 965, a DC-9-15, collided with a Cessna 150F while both aircraft were on approach to the same runway at Lambert Field in St. Louis, Missouri. The Cessna crashed, killing the two pilots aboard, while the DC-9 landed safely with no injuries to the 49 passengers and crew.
 On March 16, 1969, Viasa Flight 742, a DC-9-32, crashed into the La Trinidad neighborhood of Maracaibo, Venezuela, during a failed take-off. All 84 people on board the aircraft, as well as 71 people on the ground, were killed. With 155 dead in all, this was the deadliest crash involving a member of the original DC-9 family, as well as the worst crash in aviation history at the time it took place.
 On September 9, 1969, Allegheny Airlines Flight 853, a DC-9-30, collided in mid-air with a Piper PA-28 Cherokee near Fairland, Indiana. The DC-9 carried 78 passengers and four crew members, the Piper, one pilot. Both aircraft were destroyed, and all occupants were killed.
 On February 15, 1970, a Dominicana de Aviación DC-9-32 crashed after taking off from Santo Domingo. The crash, possibly caused by contaminated fuel, killed all 102 passengers and crew, including champion boxer Teo Cruz.
 On May 2, 1970, an Overseas National Airways DC-9, wet-leased to ALM Dutch Antilles Airlines and operating as ALM Flight 980, ditched in the Caribbean Sea on a flight from New York's John F. Kennedy International Airport to Princess Juliana International Airport on Saint Maarten. After three landing attempts in poor weather at Saint Maarten, the pilots began to divert to their alternate of Saint Croix, U.S. Virgin Islands but ran out of fuel 30 mi (48 km) short of the island. After about ten minutes, the aircraft sank in 5,000 ft (1,524 m) of water and was never recovered. 40 people survived the ditching; 23 perished.
 On November 14, 1970, Southern Airways Flight 932, a DC-9, crashed into a hill near Tri-State Airport in Huntington, West Virginia. All 75 on board were killed (including 37 members of the Marshall University Thundering Herd football team, eight members of the coaching staff, 25 boosters, and others).
 On June 6, 1971, Hughes Airwest Flight 706 was involved in a midair collision with a U.S. Marine Corps F-4 Phantom fighter. All 49 people on board the DC-9 died; one of two aboard the USMC aircraft ejected and survived.
 On January 21, 1972, a Turkish Airlines DC-9-32 TC-JAC diverted to Adana, Turkey after pressurization problems. The aircraft hit the ground during downwind on the 2nd approach and caught fire. There was one fatality.
 On January 26, 1972, JAT Flight 367 from Stockholm to Belgrade, DC-9-32 registration YU-AHT, was destroyed in flight by a bomb placed on board. The sole survivor was a flight attendant, Vesna Vulović, who holds the record for the world's longest fall without a parachute when she fell some  inside a section of the airplane and survived.
 On December 20, 1972, North Central Airlines Flight 575, DC-9-31 registration N954N, collided during its takeoff roll with Delta Air Lines Flight 954, a Convair CV-880 that was taxiing across the same runway at O'Hare International Airport in Chicago, Illinois. The DC-9 was destroyed, killing 10 and injuring 15 of the 45 people on board; two people among the 93 aboard the Convair 880 suffered minor injuries.
 On 5 March 1973, an Iberia Flight 504 DC-9 flying from Palma de Mallorca to London collided in mid-air with a Spantax Flight 400 Convair 990 flying from Madrid to London. All 68 people on board the DC-9 were killed. The CV-990 made a successful emergency landing at Cognac – Châteaubernard Air Base.
 On July 31, 1973, Delta Air Lines Flight 723, DC-9-31 registration N975NE, crashed into a seawall at Logan International Airport in Boston, Massachusetts, killing all 83 passengers and 6 crew members on board. One of the passengers initially survived the accident but later died in a hospital.
 On September 11, 1974, Eastern Air Lines Flight 212, a DC-9-30 crashed just short of the runway at Charlotte, North Carolina, killing 71 out of the 82 occupants.
 On October 30, 1975, Inex-Adria Aviopromet Flight 450, a DC-9-32, hit high ground during an approach in fog near Prague-Suchdol, Czechoslovakia. 75 of the 120 people were killed.
 On September 10, 1976, an Inex-Adria Aviopromet DC-9-31 collided with a British Airways Trident over the Croatian town of Vrbovec, killing all 176 people aboard both aircraft and another person on the ground.
 On April 4, 1977, Southern Airways Flight 242, a DC-9-31, lost engine power while flying through a severe thunderstorm before crash landing onto a highway in New Hope, Georgia, striking roadside buildings. The crash and fire resulted in the death of both flight crew and 61 passengers. Nine people on the ground also died. Both flight attendants and 20 passengers survived.
 On June 26, 1978, Air Canada Flight 189, a DC-9 overran the runway in Toronto after a blown tire aborted the takeoff. Two of the 107 passengers and crew were killed.
 On September 14, 1979, Aero Trasporti Italiani Flight 12, a DC-9-32 crashed in the mountains near Cagliari, Italy while approaching Cagliari-Elmas Airport. All 27 passengers and 4 crew members died in the crash and ensuing fire.

 On June 27, 1980, Itavia Flight 870, a DC-9-15, broke up mid-air and crashed into the sea near the Italian island of Ustica. All 81 people on board were killed. The cause has been the subject of a decades-long controversy, with either a terrorist bomb on board or an accidental shootdown during a military operation blamed for the accident.
 On July 27, 1981, Aeroméxico Flight 230, a DC-9 ran off the runway in Chihuahua. Thirty passengers and two crew of the 66 on board were killed. Bad weather and pilot error were the causes of the accident.
 On June 2, 1983, Air Canada Flight 797, a DC-9 experienced an electrical fire in the aft lavatory during flight, resulting in an emergency landing at Cincinnati/Northern Kentucky International Airport. During evacuation, the sudden influx of oxygen caused a flash fire throughout the cabin, resulting in the deaths of 23 of the 41 passengers, including Canadian folk singer Stan Rogers. All five crew members survived.
 On December 7, 1983, the Madrid runway disaster took place where a departing Iberia Boeing 727 struck an Aviaco Douglas DC-9 causing the death of 93 passengers and crew. All 42 passengers and crew on board the DC-9 were killed.
On September 6, 1985, Midwest Express Airlines Flight 105, operated with a DC-9-14, crashed just after takeoff from General Mitchell International Airport in Milwaukee, Wisconsin. The crash was caused by improper control inputs by the flight crew after the number 2 engine failed, and all 31 aboard were killed.
 On August 31, 1986, Aeroméxico Flight 498 collided in mid-air with a Piper Cherokee over the city of Cerritos, California, then crashed into the city, killing all 64 aboard the aircraft, 15 people on the ground, and all three in the small plane.
 On April 4, 1987, Garuda Indonesia Flight 035, a DC-9-32, hit a pylon and crashed on approach to Polonia International Airport in bad weather with 24 fatalities.
 On November 15, 1987, Continental Airlines Flight 1713, a DC-9-14, crashed on takeoff from Stapleton International Airport in bad weather with 28 fatalities. This accident was attributed to a combination of confusion at the ATC, exceeding allowed time-limit for takeoff after de-icing the wings, and inexperienced crew.
 On November 14, 1990, Alitalia Flight 404, a DC-9-32, crashed into a hillside on approach to Zurich Airport, killing all 46 persons on board.  The crash was caused by a short circuit, which led to a failure of the aircraft's NAV receiver and GPWS system.
 On December 3, 1990, Northwest Airlines Flight 1482, a DC-9-14, taxied onto the wrong taxiway in dense fog at Detroit-Metropolitan Wayne County Airport, Michigan. It entered the active runway instead of the taxiway instructed by air traffic controllers. It was then struck by a departing Boeing 727. Nine people were killed.
 On March 5, 1991, Aeropostal Alas de Venezuela Flight 108, a DC-9-32, crashed into a mountainside in Trujillo State, Venezuela, killing all 40 passengers and five crew aboard.
 On July 2, 1994, USAir Flight 1016, DC-9-31 N954VJ crashed in Charlotte, North Carolina, while performing a go-around because of heavy storms and wind shear at the approach of runway 18R. There were 37 fatalities and 15 injured among the passengers and crew. Although the airplane came to rest in a residential area with the tail section striking a house, there were no fatalities or injuries on the ground.
 On May 11, 1996, ValuJet Flight 592, DC-9-32 N904VJ crashed in the Florida Everglades due to a fire caused by the activation of chemical oxygen generators illegally stored in the hold. The fire damaged the plane's electrical system and eventually overcame the crew, resulting in the deaths of all 110 people on board.
 On , Austral Flight 2553, a DC-9-32 registration LV-WEG, en route from Posadas to Buenos Aires, crashed near Fray Bentos, Uruguay, killing all 69 passengers and five crew on board.
 On February 2, 1998, Cebu Pacific Flight 387, a DC-9-32 RP-C1507 crashed on the slopes of Mount Sumagaya in Misamis Oriental, Philippines, killing all 104 passengers and crew on board. Aviation investigators deemed the incident to be caused by pilot error when the plane made a non-regular stopover to Tacloban.
 On November 9, 1999, TAESA Flight 725 crashed a few minutes after leaving Uruapan International Airport en route to Mexico City. 18 people were killed in the accident.
 On 10 December 2005, Sosoliso Airlines Flight 1145 from Abuja crash-landed at Port Harcourt International Airport, Nigeria. There were 108 fatalities and two survivors.
 On April 15, 2008, Hewa Bora Airways Flight 122 crashed into a residential neighborhood, in the Goma, Democratic Republic of the Congo, resulting in the deaths of at least 44 people.
 On July 6, 2008, USA Jet Airlines Flight 199, a DC-9-15F, crashed on approach to Saltillo, Mexico, after a flight from Shreveport, Louisiana. The captain died and first officer was seriously injured.

Hull losses
 On November 27, 1973, Eastern Airlines Flight 300, a DC-9-31, landed too far down the runway at Akron-Canton Airport in light rain and fog and ran off the end of the runway over an embankment and the aircraft was severely damaged and written off. All 21 passengers and 5 crew survived with various injuries.
 On April 18, 1993, Japan Air System Flight 451, a DC-9-41 JA8448 crashed while landing at Hanamaki Airport in Japan. There were 19 injuries, though all 77 aboard survived. The aircraft was written off.
 On October 6, 2000, Aeroméxico Flight 250, a DC-9-31 en route from Mexico City to Reynosa, Mexico, could not stop at the end of the runway and crashed into houses and fell into a small canal. Four people on the ground were killed. None of 83 passengers and 5 crew members were killed. The DC-9 was heavily damaged and classified as a loss. The runway had seen heavy rainfall as a result of Hurricane Keith.

Aircraft on display

 Canada
 CF-TLL (cn 47021) – DC-9-32 on static display at the Canada Aviation and Space Museum in Ottawa, Ontario, Canada. It was previously operated by Air Canada.

 Indonesia
 PK-GNC (cn 47481) – DC-9-32 painted in Garuda Indonesia's 1960s livery and put on display inside GMF hangar in Soekarno-Hatta Airport.
 PK-GNT (cn 47790) – DC-9-32 on static display at the Transportation Museum in Taman Mini Indonesia Indah in Jakarta, Indonesia. It was relegated to display status after suffering heavy damage in a landing accident in 1993. It was previously operated by Garuda Indonesia.

 Italy
 MM62012 (cn 47595) – DC-9-32 on static display at Volandia in Somma Lombardo, Varese. This aircraft was operated by the Italian Air Force as a VIP transport, carrying the president of Italy among other duties.

 Netherlands
 N292L (cn 47174) – DC-9-32 nose section displayed inside Schiphol International Airport. Painted in KLM livery although the plane never served with the airline. It was previously used by TWA and Delta Airlines.

 Mexico
 XA-JEB – Ex Aeromexico DC-9-32 on display at a park in Cadereyta de Montes, Querétaro, Mexico. Formerly Hugh Hefner's private jet, the 'Big Bunny', XA-JEB was sold in 1975 to Venezuela Airlines, who later sold it to Aeromexico, where it was operated until 2004. It was sold and placed on display in 2008 for use as an educational tool.
 "N942ML"' – with painted registration "XA-SFE" is found on the second floor of the Luxury shopping mall "Centro Comercial Santa Fe" in the business district of Mexico City. It is on on display with an Interjet livery for the Kidzania brand.
 "N606NW" – with painted registration "XA-MEX" can be found in Cuicuilo Plaza at the south of the city. Similar to "XA-SFE", it wears an Interjet Livery for the Kidzania brand.

 Spain

 EC-BQZ (cn 47456) – DC-9-32 on static display at Adolfo Suárez Madrid–Barajas Airport in Madrid.
 EC-DGB – DC-9-34 front section only preserved at Elder Museum of Science and Technology, Gran Canaria.

 United States
 N675MC (cn 47651) – DC-9-51 on static display at the Delta Flight Museum at Hartsfield–Jackson Atlanta International Airport in Atlanta, Georgia. It arrived at the museum on 27 April 2014. It was previously operated by Delta Air Lines.
 N779NC (cn 48101) – DC-9-51 was on static display at the Carolinas Aviation Museum at Charlotte Douglas International Airport in Charlotte, North Carolina, until it was scrapped in January 2017. Its ferry flight to Charlotte was the last scheduled passenger DC-9 flight in the United States. It was previously operated by Delta Air Lines.

Specifications

See also

References

Citations

Bibliography
 Becher, Thomas. Douglas Twinjets, DC-9, MD-80, MD-90 and Boeing 717. Ramsbury, Marlborough, UK: The Crowood Press, 2002. .
 "Super 80 For the Eighties". Air International, Vol 18 No 6, June 1980. pp. 267–272, 292–296. ISSN 0306-5634.
 Taylor, John W. R. Jane's All The World's Aircraft 1966–67. London: Sampson Low, Marston & Company, 1966.
 Taylor, John W. R. Jane's All The World's Aircraft 1976–77''. London: Jane's Yearbooks, 1976. .

External links

 Boeing: Historical Snapshot: DC-9/C-9 Transport
 
 McDonnell Douglas commercial history page for DC-9 series
 DC-9-10/20/30 on Airliners.net and DC-9-40/50 on Airliners.net
 DC-9 History on AviationHistoryOnline.com

 
1960s United States airliners
DC-09
DC-09
Twinjets
T-tail aircraft
Low-wing aircraft
Aircraft first flown in 1965